James Poole (29 January 1804 – 14 March 1886) was a landscape painter of Ecclesall Manor House, Sheffield, West Riding of Yorkshire, England. He was born in Birmingham and died in Sheffield.

References

External links

 

English landscape painters
19th-century English painters
1804 births
1886 deaths
Artists from Sheffield
People from Ecclesall